Santa Maria della Vittoria is a Catholic titular church and basilica dedicated to the Virgin Mary in Rome, Italy. The church is known for the masterpiece of Gian Lorenzo Bernini in the Cornaro Chapel, the Ecstasy of Saint Teresa. The church is in the Rione Sallustiano, on number 98 via XX Settembre, where this street intersects with Largo Santa Susanna. It stands to the side of the Fontana dell'Acqua Felice. The church mirrors the Church of Santa Susanna across the Largo. It is about two blocks northwest of the Piazza della Repubblica and Teatro dell'Opera metro stop.

History
The land for the church was purchased on April 20, 1607,  and built from 1608 to 1620, as a chapel dedicated to Saint Paul for the Discalced Carmelites. After the Catholic victory at the battle of White Mountain in 1620, which reversed the Reformation in Bohemia, the church was rededicated to the Virgin Mary. Turkish standards captured at the 1683 siege of Vienna hang in the church, adding to the theme of the Virgin helping to lead Catholic armies to victory.

The order itself funded the building work until the discovery of the Borghese Hermaphroditus in the excavations. Scipione Borghese, nephew of Pope Paul V, appropriated this sculpture but, in return, funded the rest of work on the façade and granted the order his architect Giovanni Battista Soria. These grants only came into effect in 1624, and work was completed two years later.

Exterior
The church is the only structure entirely designed and completed by the early Baroque architect Carlo Maderno, though the interior suffered a fire in 1833 and required restoration. Its façade, however, was erected by Giovanni Battista Soria during Maderno's lifetime, 1624-1626, showing the unmistakable influence of Maderno's Santa Susanna nearby.

Interior

Its interior has a single wide nave under a low segmental vault, with three interconnecting side chapels behind arches separated by colossal corinthian pilasters with gilded capitals that support an enriched entablature. Contrasting marble revetments are enriched with white and gilded stucco angels and putti in full relief. The interior was sequentially enriched after Maderno's death; its vault was frescoed in 1675 with triumphant themes within shaped compartments with feigned frames: The Virgin Mary Triumphing over Heresy and Fall of the Rebel Angels executed by Giovanni Domenico Cerrini in 1675.

Other sculptural detail abounds: The Dream of Joseph (left transept, Domenico Guidi, flanked by relief panels by Pierre Etienne Monnot) and the funeral monument to Cardinal Berlinghiero Gessi. There are paintings by Guercino, Nicolas Lorrain, and Domenichino. The church is also the final resting place of Saint Victoria, whose preserved remains are on display inside.

Cornaro Chapel
The masterpiece in the Cornaro Chapel, to the left of the altar, is Ecstasy of St. Teresa by Scipione's favored sculptor, Bernini. The statues depict a moment as described by Saint Teresa of Avila in her autobiography, where she had the vivid vision of a Seraph piercing her heart with a golden shaft, causing her both immense joy and pain. The flowing robes and contorted posture abandon classical restraint and repose to depict a more passionate, almost voluptuous trance. Although artistically a tour de force, nonetheless, during Bernini's lifetime and in the centuries following till this very day, Bernini's Saint Teresa has been accused of crossing a line of decency by sexualizing the visual depiction of the saint's experience, to a degree that no artist, before or after Bernini, dared to do: in depicting her at an impossibly young chronological age, as an idealized delicate beauty, in a semi-prostrate position with her mouth open and her legs splayed-apart, her wimple coming undone, with prominently displayed bare feet (Discalced Carmelites, for modesty, always wore sandals with heavy stockings) and with the seraph "undressing" her by (unnecessarily) parting her mantle to penetrate her heart with his arrow.

Titulus

Santa Maria della Vittoria was established as a titular church by Pope Pius VII on 23 December 1801. The following is a list of its Cardinal-Priests:
 Michelangelo Luchi (1801–1802)
 Joseph Fesch (1803–1822); in commendam (1822–1839)
 Ferdinando Maria Pignatelli (1839–1853)
 Adriano Fieschi (1853–1858)
 Joseph Othmar von Rauscher (1858–1875)
 Godefroy Brossais-Saint-Marc (1876–1878)
 Louis-Edouard-François-Desiré Pie (1879–1880)
 Luigi Jacobini (1880–1887)
 Elzéar-Alexandre Taschereau (1887–1898)
 Giovanni Battista Casali del Drago (1899–1908)
 François-Marie-Anatole de Rovérié de Cabrières (1911–1921)
 Alexis-Armand Charost (1922–1930)
 Angelo Maria Dolci (1933–1936)
 Federico Tedeschini (1936–1951)
 Giuseppe Siri (1953–1989)
 Giuseppe Caprio (1990–2005)
 Seán Patrick O'Malley, OFM Cap (2006–incumbent)

References

Sources

 Sturm, Saverio (2015). L’architettura dei Carmelitani Scalzi in età barocca: La ‘Provincia Romana’. Lazio, Umbria e Marche (1597-1705). Roma: Gangemi Editore.
 Hibbert, Howard (1965).  Bernini.  New York: Pelican-Penguin.
 Susanne Juliane Warma (1981). A Study of the Iconography of Bernini's Cornaro Chapel in Santa Maria Della Vittoria Athens: University of Georgia.
 G. Matthiae (1965). S. Maria della Vittoria. Rome.

External links
Chris Nyborg, "Churches of Rome: Santa Maria della Vittoria"
Roberto Piperno, "santa Maria della Vittoria"
"Santa Maria della Vittoria" (in Italian)
Roma SPQR: "Santa Maria della Vittoria"

Maria Vittoria
Maria Vittoria
Baroque architecture in Rome
Roman Catholic churches completed in 1626
1626 establishments in Italy
Maria Vittoria
17th-century Roman Catholic church buildings in Italy
Carlo Maderno buildings